|}

This is a list of electoral district results of the 1950 Western Australian election.

Results by Electoral district

Albany

Avon Valley 

 Preferences were not distributed.

Blackwood

Boulder

Bunbury

Canning

Claremont

Collie

Cottesloe

Dale 

 Two party preferred vote was estimated.

Darling Range

East Perth

Eyre

Fremantle 

 Two party preferred vote was estimated.

Gascoyne

Geraldton

Greenough

Guildford-Midland 

 Two party preferred vote was estimated.

Hannans

Harvey

Kalgoorlie

Katanning

Kimberley

Leederville

Maylands

Melville

Merredin-Yilgarn

Middle Swan

Moore

Mount Hawthorn 

 Two party preferred vote was estimated.

Mount Lawley

Mount Marshall

Murchison

Murray

Narrogin

Nedlands

North Perth

Northam

Pilbara

Roe

South Fremantle

South Perth

Stirling

Subiaco

Toodyay

Vasse

Victoria Park

Warren

Wembley Beaches

West Perth 

 Two party preferred vote was estimated.

See also 

 1950 Western Australian state election
 Members of the Western Australian Legislative Assembly, 1950–1953

References 

Results of Western Australian elections
1950 elections in Australia